Achucarro or Achúcarro is a surname. Notable people with the surname include:

Ana Achúcarro (born 1962), Spanish astroparticle physicist
Ignacio Achúcarro (born 1936), Paraguayan footballer
Joaquín Achúcarro (born 1932), Spanish classical pianist
Jorge Achucarro (born 1981), Paraguayan footballer

Other uses
Achucarro Basque Center for Neuroscience